Job 4 is the fourth chapter of the Book of Job in the Hebrew Bible or the Old Testament of the Christian Bible. The book is anonymous; most scholars believe it was written around 6th century BCE. This chapter records the speech of Eliphaz the Temanite (one of Job's friends), which belongs to the Dialogue section of the book, comprising Job 3:1–31:40.

Text
The original text is written in Hebrew language. This chapter is divided into 21 verses.

Textual witnesses
Some early manuscripts containing the text of this chapter in Hebrew are of the Masoretic Text, which includes the Aleppo Codex (10th century), and Codex Leningradensis (1008).

There is also a translation into Koine Greek known as the Septuagint, made in the last few centuries BC; some extant ancient manuscripts of this version include Codex Vaticanus (B; B; 4th century), Codex Sinaiticus (S; BHK: S; 4th century), and Codex Alexandrinus (A; A; 5th century).

Analysis
The structure of the book is as follows:
The Prologue (chapters 1–2)
The Dialogue (chapters 3–31)
The Verdicts (32:1–42:6)
The Epilogue (42:7–17)

Within the structure, chapter 4 is grouped into the Dialogue section with the following outline:
Job's Self-Curse and Self-Lament (3:1–26)
Round One (4:1–14:22)
Eliphaz (4:1–5:27)
Introduction (4:1-6)
A Summary Outline of Retribution (4:7-11)
Eliphaz's Vision and Its Implications (4:12-21)
The Experience of the Fool (5:1-7)
Commit your Cause to God, Who Is Active (5:8-16)
God Will Reward the Righteous (5:17-27)
Job (6:1–7:21)
Bildad (8:1–22)
Job (9:1–10:22)
Zophar (11:1–20)
Job (12:1–14:22)
Round Two (15:1–21:34) 
Round Three (22:1–27:23)
Interlude – A Poem on Wisdom (28:1–28)
Job's Summing Up (29:1–31:40)

The Dialogue section is composed in the format of poetry with distinctive syntax and grammar. The first speech of Eliphaz in chapters 4 and 5 can be broken down into three main sections:
Job 4:1-11: Eliphaz wonders that Job should fall into such despair, despite having comforted so many people in trouble, and having been so pious, so Eliphaz accuses Job of forgetting the great truth that the righteous never perish under affliction—calamity only destroys the wicked.
Job 4:12-5:7: Eliphaz tries to warn Job about complaining against God because only the ungodly resent the dealings of God and by their impatience bring down his wrath upon them. 
Job 5:8-27: Eliphaz appeals to Job to follow a different course, to seek after God, for God only smites to heal or to correct, to draw people to himself and away from evil.<ref>Fullerton, K. “Double Entendre in the First Speech of Eliphaz,” JBL 49 (1930): 320-74; J. C. L. Gibson, “Eliphaz the Temanite: A Portrait of a Hebrew Philosopher,” SJT 28 (1975): 259-72; and J. Lust, “A Stormy Vision: Some Remarks on Job 4:12-16,” Bijdr 36 (1975): 308-11. Apud' Note [a] on Job 4:1 in NET Bible</ref>

Eliphaz's summary outline of retribution (4:1–11)
This section can be divided into two parts: an introduction (verses 1–6) followed by an outline of the retribution by Eliphaz (verses 7–11). Twice in the beginning of his speech Eliphaz starts off in a respectful way to Job (verse 2a; verses 3–4) before using "but" to speak what he really wants to say: that Job should apply the advices he himself had given to others and using a godly manner to gain consolation. Eliphaz sets forth the arguments that will be explored in the debate, such as:
"You can trust in God to restore you" (using two words 'blameless' and a 'God-fearer', Job 1:1, 8; 2:3, that characterized Job)
"Wickedness is punished"
"Human beings are naturally culpable"
"The prosperity of the sinful will be cut short"
"The best course is to seek God"
"Suffering is an indication of divine discipline"

Eliphaz appeals to consensus (4:7), that he expects Job to 'concur in the common dogma of retribution', as well as appeals to individual experience (4:8, 'As I have seen'), to special revelation (4:12-21), to collective experience (5:27a, 'See, we have searched this out; it is true'), and to the obvious insights encapsulated in proverbial sayings (4:8, 'those who plough iniquity and sow trouble reap the same'; 5:2, 'Surely
vexation kills the fool, and jealousy slays the simple'). Convinced that a principle of reward and punishment governed the universe, Eliphaz is oblivious to the pain resulting from this dogma (4:7–9, where a divine wind brings destruction like the tempest that killed Job's children).

The poem contains rich vocabulary, such as the use five different words for lion in 4:10–11 (cf. Joel 1:4 for similar richness), which metaphorically might allude to the death of Job's children.

"Temanite": that is, coming from Teman, an important city of Edom (.

Verse 10–11
[Eliphaz said:] The roaring of the lion, and the voice of the fierce lion,and the teeth of the young lions are broken.The old lion perishes for lack of prey,and the cubs of the lioness are scattered"Lion": in these verses five occurrences, including the addition of English adjectives, are translated from five different Hebrew words:
,  (in "the roaring of [the lion]"; singular) This is the generic term for “lion.”
,  (in "the voice of [the fierce lion]"; singular)
,  (in "the teeth of [the young lions"]; plural)
,  (in "[the old lion] perishes"; singular) This word is traditionally rendered "strong lion," occurs only three times in the Hebrew Bible (Job 4:11, Proverbs 30:30 and Isaiah 30:6, but has cognates in several of the Semitic languages to indicate 'lion as king of the beasts'. 
,  (in "the cubs of [the lioness]"; singular)
D. J. A. Clines thinks that it is 'probably impossible to distinguish' the meaning of these words.

The Greek Septuagint renders verse 10 as “the strength of the lion, and the voice of the lioness and the exulting cry of serpents are quenched.”

Eliphaz's vision (4:12–21)

In this section Eliphaz shares the divine visitation he received while in adeep sleep (tardēmâ; cf. Abraham in ), when he felt a wind (rûah) glided past his face, but could not make out the exact appearance of the deity, only could 'grasp the brief word that follows an eerie silence': 'Can a mortal be more righteous than God (Eloah)?' (verses 12–17). Eliphaz then draws the implications of this in 'a series of reflection on human condition', implicitly on 'Job and his situation' (verses 18–21).

Verse 17

See also

Related Bible parts: Genesis 15, Job 2, Job 42

References

Sources

External links
 Jewish translations:
 Iyov - Job - Chapter 4 (Judaica Press) translation [with Rashi's commentary] at Chabad.org
 Christian translations:
 Online Bible at GospelHall.org (ESV, KJV, Darby, American Standard Version, Bible in Basic English)
 Book of Job Chapter 4. Various versions
  Various versions

04